Petr Kuboš (born September 10, 1979) is a Czech professional ice hockey defenceman. He currently plays for HC Kometa Brno of the Czech Extraliga. He was selected by the Montreal Canadiens in the 8th round (197th overall) of the 1997 NHL Entry Draft.

Kuboš previously played also for HC Vsetín, HC Znojemští Orli and HC Vítkovice.

References

External links
 

1979 births
Living people
Czech ice hockey defencemen
HC Kometa Brno players
HC Slavia Praha players
HC Vítkovice players
Montreal Canadiens draft picks
People from Vsetín
VHK Vsetín players
Sportspeople from the Zlín Region
Orli Znojmo players
Molot-Prikamye Perm players
Prince George Cougars players
Hokej Šumperk 2003 players
GKS Tychy players
Czech expatriate ice hockey players in Canada
Czech expatriate ice hockey players in Russia
Czech expatriate sportspeople in Poland
Czech expatriate sportspeople in Iceland
Expatriate ice hockey players in Iceland
Expatriate ice hockey players in Poland